Texas Tech University (Texas Tech, Tech, or TTU) is a public research university in Lubbock, Texas. The university's student enrollment is the sixth-largest in Texas as of the Fall 2020 semester. As of fall 2020, there were 40,322 students (33,269 undergraduate and 7,053 graduate) enrolled at Texas Tech. With over 25% of its undergraduate student population identifying as Hispanic, Texas Tech University is a designated Hispanic-serving institution (HSI).

The university offers degrees in more than 150 courses of study through 13 colleges and hosts 60 research centers and institutes. Texas Tech University has awarded over 200,000 degrees since 1927, including over 40,000 graduate and professional degrees. Texas Tech is classified among "R1: Doctoral Universities – Very high research activity." Research projects in the areas of epidemiology, pulsed power, grid computing, classics, nanophotonics, atmospheric sciences, and wind energy are among the most prominent at the university. The Spanish Renaissance-themed campus, described by author James Michener as "the most beautiful west of the Mississippi until you get to Stanford", has been awarded the Grand Award for excellence in grounds-keeping, and has been noted for possessing a public art collection among the ten best in the United States.

The Texas Tech Red Raiders are charter members of the Big 12 Conference and compete in Division I for all varsity sports. The Red Raiders football team has made 40 bowl appearances, which is 17th most of any university. The Red Raiders basketball team has made 14 appearances in the NCAA Division I Tournament. Bob Knight, who has the fifth-most wins as a head coach in men's NCAA Division I basketball history, served as the team's head coach from 2001 to 2008. The Lady Raiders basketball team won the 1993 NCAA Division I Tournament. In 1999, Texas Tech's Goin' Band from Raiderland received the Sudler Trophy, which is awarded to "recognize collegiate marching bands of particular excellence".

Although the majority of the university's students are from the southwestern United States, the school has served students from all 50 states and more than 100 countries. Texas Tech alumni and former students have gone on to prominent careers in government, business, science, medicine, education, sports, and entertainment.

History

Establishment 

The call to open a college in West Texas began shortly after settlers arrived in the area in the 1880s. In 1917, the Texas legislature passed a bill creating a branch of Texas A&M to be in Abilene. However, the bill was repealed two years later during the next session after it was discovered Governor James E. Ferguson had falsely reported the site committee's choice of location. After new legislation passed in the state house and senate in 1921, Governor Pat Neff vetoed it, citing hard financial times in West Texas. Furious about Neff's veto, some in West Texas went so far as to recommend West Texas secede from the state.

In 1923, the legislature decided, rather than a branch campus, a new university would better serve the region's needs under legislation co-authored by State Senator William H. Bledsoe of Lubbock and State Representative Roy Alvin Baldwin of Slaton in southern Lubbock County.  On February 10, 1923, Neff signed the legislation creating Texas Technological College, and in July of that year, a committee began searching for a site. When the committee's members visited Lubbock, they were overwhelmed to find residents lining the streets to show support for hosting the institution. That August, Lubbock was chosen on the first ballot over other area towns, including Floydada, Plainview, Big Spring, and Sweetwater.

Construction of the college campus began on November 1, 1924. Ten days later, the cornerstone of the Administration Building was laid in front of 20,000 people. Governor Pat Neff, Amon G. Carter, Reverend E. E. Robinson, Colonel Ernest O. Thompson, and Representative Richard M. Chitwood, the chairman of the House Education Committee, who became the first Texas Tech business manager, spoke at the event. Chitwood served in the position only fifteen months; he died in November 1926. With an enrollment of 914 students—both men and women—Texas Technological College opened for classes on October 1, 1925. It was originally composed of four schools—Agriculture, Engineering, Home Economics, and Liberal Arts.

Military training was conducted at the college as early as 1925, but formal Reserve Officers' Training Corps training did not start until 1936. By 1939, the school's enrollment had grown to 3,890. Although enrollment declined during World War II, Texas Tech trained 4,747 men in its armed forces training detachments. Following the war, in 1946, the college saw its enrollment leap to 5,366 from a low of 1,696 in 1943.

Expansion and growth 

By the 1960s, the school had expanded its offerings to more than just technical subjects. The Faculty Advisory Committee suggested changing the name to "Texas State University", feeling the phrase "Technological College" did not define the institution's scope. While most students supported this change, the Board of Directors and many alumni, wanting to preserve the Double T, opposed it. Other names—University of the Southwest, Texas Technological College and State University, and The Texas University of Art, Science and Technology—were considered, but the Board of Directors chose Texas Tech University, submitting it to the state legislature in 1964.

A failed move by Governor John Connally to have the school placed into the Texas A&M University System, as well as continued disagreement and heated debate over the school's new name, kept the name change from being approved. In spite of objections by many students and faculty, the Board of Directors again submitted the change in 1969. It finally received the legislature's approval on June 6 and the name Texas Tech University went into effect that September. All of the institution's schools, except Law, became colleges.

Texas Tech was integrated in 1961 when three African-American students were admitted. After its initial rejection of the students' enrollment and the threat of a lawsuit, the university enacted a policy to admit "all qualified applicants regardless of color". The university offered its first athletic scholarship to a black student in 1967, when Danny Hardaway was recruited to play for the Red Raiders football team. In 1970, Hortense W. Dixon became the first African American student to earn a doctorate from the university. In 1972 Charles Henry became the first full-time African American faculty member.

In the 1960s and 1970s, the university invested US$150 million in the campus to construct buildings for the library, foreign languages, social sciences, communications, philosophy, electrical and petroleum engineering, art, and architecture. Some other buildings were significantly expanded.

On May 29, 1969, the 61st Texas Legislature created the Texas Tech University School of Medicine. The Texas Legislature expanded the medical school charter in 1979, creating the Texas Tech University Health Sciences Center. TTUHSC, which is now part of the Texas Tech University System, includes Schools of Allied Health Sciences, Medicine, Nursing, Pharmacy, and the Graduate School of Biomedical Sciences. It has locations in four Texas cities in addition to the main campus in Lubbock.

In 2011, the combined enrollment in the Texas Tech University System was greater than 42,000 students—a 48% increase since 2000. Chancellor Kent Hance reiterated plans for Texas Tech's main campus to reach enrollment of 40,000 students by 2020, with additional 5,000 students at Texas Tech University Health Sciences Center and 10,000 students at Angelo State University.

Recent history 

In 1996, the Board of Regents of Texas Tech University created the Texas Tech University System. Former State Senator John T. Montford, later of San Antonio, was selected as the first chancellor to lead the combined academic enterprise. Regents Chair Edward Whitacre Jr. stated the move was made due to the institution's size and complexity. "It's time", he said, "to take the university into the 21st century". The Texas Tech University system originally included Texas Tech University and Texas Tech University Health Sciences Center. On November 6, 2007, the voters of Texas approved an amendment to the Texas Constitution realigning Angelo State University with the Texas Tech University System. Kent Hance, a Texas Tech graduate who had served as United States Representative and as one of the three elected members of the Texas Board which regulates the oil-and-gas industry, assumed the duties of chancellor on December 1, 2006.

Although growth continued at Texas Tech, the university was not immune to controversy. In 2003, a third-year student at the Texas Tech School of Law filed suit against the university over its policy on free speech zones, which restricted student speech to a single "free speech gazebo". The following year, a federal judge declared the policy unconstitutional.

To meet the demands of its increased enrollment and expanding research, the university has invested more than $548 million in new construction since 2000. It has also received more than $65.9 million in private donations. In April 2009, the Texas House of Representatives passed a bill to increase state funding for seven public universities. Texas Tech University is classified by the state as an "Emerging Research University", and is among the universities that will receive additional state funding for advancement toward "Tier 1" status. Three funds—the Research University Development Fund, the Texas Research Incentive Program, and the National Research University Benchmark Fund—have been established and will provide $500 million in grants and matching funds during fiscal years 2010 and 2011. On September 2, 2009, the university announced it had received private gifts totaling $24.3 million. Of these, $21.5 million are eligible for match under the Texas Research Incentive Program.

In late 2011 and throughout 2012–13, construction began on several new buildings on campus. The construction included a new $20 million Petroleum Engineering and Research building, a new building to house the Rawls College of Business, two new residence halls, a $3.5 million chapel, and extensive remodeling of the building that previously housed the Rawls College of Business. In 2021, construction began on the new $100 million, 125,000-square-foot Academic Sciences Building.

The university system's endowment reached $1.043 billion in March 2014, surpassing one billion dollars for the first time.

Academics 

By enrollment, Texas Tech is the seventh-largest university in Texas and the largest institution of higher education in the western two-thirds of the state. In the Fall 2014 semester, Texas Tech set a record enrollment with 35,134 students. For the 2014 enrollment year, most students came from Texas (95.17%), followed by New Mexico, California, Colorado, Oklahoma, and Florida. Altogether, the university has educated students from all 50 US states and over 100 foreign countries. Enrollment has continued to increase in recent years, and growth is on track with a plan to have 40,000 students by 2020. From 1927 to 2011, the university awarded 173,551 bachelor's, 34,541 master's, 5,906 doctoral, and 7,092 law degrees.

The Princeton Review ranked Texas Tech among the 125 best colleges in the Western United States in its 2015 edition. The 2016 U.S. News & World Report rankings listed the university at 168th nationally and 91st amongst public schools. The 2013 Shanghai Jiao Tong Rankings placed Texas Tech University at 401 worldwide, which tied it with fellow Big 12 schools Oklahoma and Kansas State, among others. In 2010, the Wall Street Journal ranked the university 18th in its ranking of graduate desirability for job recruiters. Three of the university's undergraduate programs are ranked by PayScale as in the top 20 nationally in mid-career salary: Art, Physical and Life Sciences, and Education. In its 2015 edition, U.S. News & World Report noted the university has a "selective" undergraduate admissions policy. As a public university, Texas Tech is subject to Texas House Bill 588, which guarantees Texas high school seniors in the top 10% of their graduating class admission to any public Texas university. In 2012, 20.3% of incoming freshmen were admitted in this manner. About half of incoming freshmen finished in the top quarter of their graduating classes. In 2016, the Carnegie Classification of Institutions of Higher Education listed Texas Tech among 115 most prominent research schools, commonly known as "Carnegie Tier One".

Texas Tech University is accredited by the Southern Association of Colleges and Schools. The university offers 150 bachelor's, 104 master's, and 59 doctoral degree programs. Texas Tech has five satellite campuses in Texas—in Abilene, Amarillo, Fredericksburg, Highland Lakes, and Junction. Texas Tech also has a satellite campus in Europe, in Seville, Spain, and one in Escazú, San José, Costa Rica. Additional study-abroad programs are offered in various countries, such as Denmark, England, France, and Italy.

The Office of International Affairs supports and facilitates the international mission of Texas Tech University. It provides services for faculty and students, offers international educational and cultural experiences for the school and community, and contributes to the university's globalization process and its effort to grow as an international educational and research center. The International Cultural Center provides a continual series of conferences, lectures, art exhibitions, and performances.

Colleges and schools 
Texas Tech has expanded from its original four schools to comprise ten colleges and two schools.

In the 2015 U.S. News & World Report report on higher education, the Whitacre College of Engineering was ranked 94th in the nation.  In 2009, the college's Petroleum Engineering Department was ranked 10th best in the nation. The college offers 11 engineering programs accredited by the Accreditation Board for Engineering and Technology. On November 12, 2008, following a $25 million gift from AT&T in honor of alumnus Edward Whitacre Jr., the college was formally renamed the Edward E. Whitacre Jr. College of Engineering.

The largest academic division on campus, the College of Arts & Sciences offers bachelor's, master's, and doctoral degrees in a wide range of subjects from philosophy to mathematics. In 2004, the College of Mass Communications and the College of Visual & Performing Arts were created from programs organized within the College of Arts and Sciences. The College of Mass Communications changed its name to the College of Media & Communication in 2012 and offers degrees in several areas, including advertising, journalism and electronic media, and public relations. The College of Visual & Performing Arts was renamed in honor of the contributions by the J. T. & Margaret Talkington Foundation in 2016; Programs offered through Talkington College are accredited by the National Association of Schools of Art and Design, the National Association of Schools of Music, and the National Association of Schools of Theatre.

Once the Division of Home Economics, the College of Human Sciences now offers degrees in applied and professional studies, design, human development, nutrition, hospitality, and retailing. The College of Human Sciences' Department of Personal Financial Planning was ranked in 2011 as the top program out of ten standout programs by the industry newsletter, Financial Planning. The College of Architecture, founded in 1927, offers programs accredited by the National Architectural Accrediting Board.

The Rawls College of Business, which is accredited by the Association to Advance Collegiate Schools of Business, is the university's business school. The college offers bachelor's, master's, and doctoral degrees in business disciplines. In its 2016 "Best Grad Schools" rankings, U.S. News & World Report ranked the graduate business program 91st in the United States. The college's health organization management degree program was ranked 41st. From its origin in 1942, the business school was known as the Division of Commerce, until it was renamed the College of Business Administration in 1956. In 2000, following a $25 million gift from alumnus Jerry S. Rawls, the college was formally renamed the Jerry S. Rawls College of Business Administration.

In 1967, both the College of Education and the Texas Tech University School of Law were founded. The College of Education instructs future teachers and is accredited by the National Council for Accreditation of Teacher Education. The School of Law is an American Bar Association-accredited law school on the main campus in Lubbock, and came in 2nd statewide in the 2013 Bar Examination pass rate with 95.45 percent. The school offers Juris Doctor degrees which can be earned in conjunction with Master of Business Administration or Master of Science degrees through the adjacent Rawls College of Business.

All graduate programs offered at Texas Tech University are overseen by the Graduate School, which was officially established in 1954. The university's Honors College allows select students to design a customized curriculum that incorporates a broad range of disciplines, and offers students the opportunity for early admission into Texas Tech University's medical and law schools.

In September 2008, the University College was established. Formerly known as the College of Outreach and Distance Education, the college was created by bringing together the Division of Off-Campus Sites and the Division of Outreach and Distance Education. Texas Tech's six in-state satellite campuses are under the auspices of the college. Additionally, it oversees the Texas Tech University Independent School District.

The Texas Tech University System also operates a medical school, the Texas Tech University Health Sciences Center. It offers Schools of Allied Health Sciences, Biomedical Sciences, Medicine, Nursing, and Pharmacy. While it is a discrete entity, separate from Texas Tech University, it offers joint degrees (such as MD/MBA) through coordination with the university. Further, the Health Sciences Center is on the university's main campus in Lubbock. In addition to the Lubbock campus, TTUHSC has campuses in Abilene, Amarillo, El Paso, Dallas, and Odessa.

Research 

Classified by the Carnegie Foundation in 2016 as one of only 115 research universities with "highest activity", Texas Tech University hosts 71 research centers and institutes. In 2008, a team of researchers from Texas Tech University and Harvard University announced the development of an siRNA-based treatment that may ultimately counteract the human immunodeficiency virus (HIV). Human cells infected with HIV, injected into rats, have been cured by the experimental treatment. Clinical trials on humans are expected to begin by 2010. Texas Tech researchers also hold the exclusive license for HemoTech, a human blood substitute composed of bovine hemoglobin. HemoBioTech, the company marketing the technology, believes HemoTech will diminish the intrinsic toxicities that have stifled previous attempts to develop a human blood substitute. On January 14, 2008, Texas Tech University announced the creation of the West Texas Influenza Research Center. The university has concluded human clinical testing of oral interferon in a five-year study of idiopathic pulmonary fibrosis and continues its study of chronic obstructive pulmonary disease.

Following the May 11, 1970, Lubbock Tornado that caused 26 fatalities and over $ (2013 dollars) in damage in Lubbock, the National Wind Institute (formerly the Wind Science and Engineering Research Center or WISE) was established. The National Wind Institute Center, which includes  of indoor laboratory space, is focused on research, education, and information outreach. The interdisciplinary research program studies methods to exploit the beneficial qualities of wind and to mitigate its detrimental effects. The center offers education in wind science and engineering to develop professionals who are experts in creating designs which deal effectively with problems caused by high winds. The Center instituted the nation's first Ph.D program in Wind Science and Engineering in 2003. National Wind Institute researchers contributed significantly to the development of the Enhanced Fujita Scale for rating the strength of tornadoes.

Texas Tech has made many contributions to NASA projects. Daniel Cooke, Computer Science Department Chair, and his colleagues are working to develop the technical content of the Intelligent Systems Program, and have been awarded a five-year budget valued at $350 million. University scientists have also teamed with NASA's guidance, navigation, and control engineers to develop the Onboard Abort Executive (OAE), software capable of quickly deciding the best course of action during an ascent failure. The Texas Tech Space Research Initiative has also partnered with NASA to perfect methods for growing fresh vegetables in space and to determine the most efficient ways to recycle wastewater.  In November 1996, the university dedicated the Charles A. Bassett II Pulse Laboratory to honor engineering alumnus and Gemini-era astronaut Charles A. Bassett II.  In total, Texas Tech has helped to produce five astronauts including Bassett, Paul Lockhart, and Rick Husband; Husband was commander of STS-107, the final flight of Space Shuttle Columbia.

In 2008, the pulsed power electronics laboratory received $4 million in federal funding. Among other things, the money will be used to create compact generators for weapon systems designed to destroy improvised explosive devices (IEDs). The College of Engineering's Nano Tech Center has received approximately $20 million in grants toward its work in applied nanophotonics, the creation and manipulation of advanced materials at the nanoscale that can produce and sense light. Texas Tech's Center for Advanced Analytics and Business Intelligence performs grid computing research through collaboration with the SAS Institute that seeks to improve the speed with which large quantities of data (such as those present in genomics and global economics) can be processed.

Texas Tech's College of Agricultural Science and Natural Resources has received state and federal grants for research projects including the fiber properties of cotton, the antibacterial properties of cotton fabric, and the development of chemical-warfare protective fabrics. The college has also created two grass variants, Shadow Turf, a drought-tolerant turf grass that thrives in shade, and Tech Turf (marketed as Turffalo), a turf grass with the rich color and texture of Bermuda and the resilience of buffalo grass.

Online and regional learning programs 
Texas Tech offers online and regional programs in addition to programs offered on the main campus.  There are programs that are fully online, hybrid/blended, and at regional sites. The university offers bachelor's, master's, and doctoral degrees, as well as a graduate certification preparation program, at the regional sites of El Paso, Fredericksburg, Highland Lakes, Center at Junction, and Waco.

Texas Tech's online engineering program also gained recognition from U.S. News & World Report, ranking 20th on their list of the best graduate online engineering programs.

Campus 

The Lubbock campus is home to the main academic university, law school, and medical school (Health Sciences Center). It is one of two institutions (the other being UT Austin) in Texas to have a graduate school, law school, and medical school on its main campus. The campus, which boasts Spanish Renaissance architecture, was described by American author James A. Michener as the "most beautiful west of the Mississippi until you get to Stanford" and by Stewart Mandel of Sports Illustrated as "easily one of the ten most beautiful campuses" he had seen. Many buildings on campus borrow architectural elements from those found at University de Alcalá in Alcalá de Henares, Spain, and Mission San José in San Antonio. A large section of the campus built between 1924 and 1951 is listed on the National Register of Historic Places as the Texas Technological College Historic District. This area is roughly bounded by 6th Street on the north, University Avenue on the east, 19th Street on the south, and Flint Street on the west. In 2008, the Professional Grounds Management Society awarded Texas Tech the Grand Award for excellence in grounds-keeping, and merit awards in 2007, 2010, and 2014.

In 1998, the Board of Regents of the Texas Tech University System created the Texas Tech University Public Art Collection to enliven the campus environment and extend the university's educational mission. It is funded by using one percent of the estimated total cost of each new building on campus. The collection features pieces from artists such as Tom Otterness and Glenna Goodacre. Public Art Review has ranked the Texas Tech University Public Art Collection among the ten best university public art collections in the United States.

The university also hosts the Museum of Texas Tech University, which was founded in 1929 and is accredited by the American Alliance of Museums. The museum is home to over eight million objects and specimens and houses the Moody Planetarium, art galleries, a sculpture court, and a natural science research laboratory. It also operates the Val Verde County research site and the Lubbock Lake Landmark, an archaeological site and natural history preserve in the city of Lubbock. The site has evidence of 12,000 years of use by ancient cultures on the Llano Estacado (Southern High Plains), and allows visitors to watch active archaeological digs. Visiting scientists and tourists may also participate in the discovery process. Lubbock Lake Landmark is a National Historic Landmark, which lists it on the National Register of Historic Places, and is a designated State Archaeological Landmark. Texas Tech is also the location of the Southwest Collection of historical archives and the sponsoring institution of the West Texas Historical Association.
Located on the northern edge of the campus is the National Ranching Heritage Center, a museum of ranching history. The site spans  and is home to 38 historic structures that have been restored to their original condition. Structures represented at the center include a linecamp, a dugout, a bunkhouse, a blacksmith shop, a cowchip house, a schoolhouse, corrals, shipping pens, windmills, chuckwagons, and a coal-burning locomotive.

The university maintains a number of libraries, some general-purpose and some dedicated to specific topics such as architecture and law. Among the most notable of these are the Southwest Collection/Special Collections Library and the Vietnam Center and Archive, the nation's largest and most comprehensive collections of information on the Vietnam War. On August 17, 2007, the Vietnam Center and Archive became the first US institution to sign a formalized exchange agreement with the State Records and Archives Department of Vietnam. This opens the door for a two-way exchange between the entities.

Student life 

There are over 516 student clubs and organizations at Texas Tech. Many students participate in Greek Life. Texas Tech Greek Life includes 12 Panhellenic Sororities and 24\2 InterFraternity Council Fraternities, as well as groups in the National Pan-Hellenic Council (NPHC) and Multicultural Greek Council (MGC). The Student Union Building, located centrally on campus, is the hub of daily student activity. It houses restaurants, coffee shops, a book store, meeting rooms, lecture halls, movie rooms, and study areas, as well as the offices and meeting rooms of several student organizations and the Student Government Association. Directly next to the Student Union Building is the School of Music, home of the Texas Tech Goin' Band from Raiderland. The 450-member band, which was awarded the Sudler Trophy in 1999, performs at all home football games and other events.

Approximately 20% of students live on campus, and most students live on campus for at least a portion of their academic careers. Students with fewer than 30 hours of academic credit are required to live in university housing unless they receive an exemption. Specific residence halls and communities exist for graduate students, athletes, and various specific interests and academic disciplines. Every resident on campus is a member of the Texas Tech Residence Hall Association which provides various on campus programming and leadership opportunities. RHA is led by an Executive Board and Senate with student representatives from each residence hall. The organization is also a member of the South West Affiliate of College and Universities Residence Halls.

International honor societies Phi Beta Kappa (liberal arts and sciences), Delta Epsilon Psi, Beta Gamma Sigma (business), and Tau Beta Pi (engineering) have chapters at the university. Professional, service, and social fraternities and sororities on campus include Alpha Phi Omega (service), Alpha Kappa Psi (business), Delta Sigma Pi (business), Alpha Omega Epsilon (engineering), Phi Alpha Delta (law), Phi Mu Alpha Sinfonia (music), Kappa Kappa Psi (band), and Tau Beta Sigma (band). Professional development and research organizations hosted by the university include the Howard Hughes Medical Institute Undergraduate Research Fellowship Program, the Center for the Integration of Science Education and Research, the Society of Engineering Technologists, Student Bar Association, and the Texas Tech Forensic Union. Texas Tech is also the only Power Five university in Texas that is a Hispanic-serving Institution. Spirit organizations representing Texas Tech include the High Riders, Saddle Tramps, and the Sabre Flight Drill Team.

The university maintains KTXT-FM 88.1, formerly a student radio station focusing on alternative, indie rock, industrial, and hip hop music. After 47 years, the station went off the air on December 10, 2008. It returned in May 2009 with a different format and plans to eventually return to its former style. National Public Radio station KTTZ-FM 89.1, which features classical music and news, is also found on campus. Additionally, the university owns and operates Public Broadcasting Service television station KTTZ-TV. Students run a daily newspaper, The Daily Toreador, until 2005 known as The University Daily. The university also produces a yearbook, La Ventana.

Athletics 

Texas Tech's athletic teams are known as the Red Raiders with the exception of the women's basketball team, which is known as the Lady Raiders. Texas Tech competes in NCAA Division I FBS (formerly Division I-A) and is a member of the Big 12 Conference. From 1932 until 1956, the university belonged to the Border Intercollegiate Athletic Association. After being rejected eight times over more than 20 years, the Southwest Conference admitted Texas Tech on May 12, 1956.  When the Southwest Conference disbanded in 1995, Texas Tech, along with the University of Texas at Austin, Texas A&M University, and Baylor University, merged with schools from the former Big Eight Conference to form the Big 12. Athletic Director Kirby Hocutt is a member of the College Football Playoff committee. Texas Tech varsity teams have won two NCAA national titles, most recently the men's outdoor track and field championship in 2019, while the Lady Raiders basketball team won the school's first ever title in 1993.

The Texas Tech Lady Raiders, led by player Sheryl Swoopes and head coach Marsha Sharp, won the 1993 NCAA Division I Women's Basketball Championship. The men's basketball team has made 14 appearances in the NCAA Men's Division I Tournament. Bob Knight served as men's basketball coach from the beginning of the 2001 season until February 4, 2008. On January 1, 2007, he set the record for most coaching victories in men's NCAA Division I basketball history when the Red Raiders defeated the New Mexico Lobos, 70–68. Upon Knight's retirement, his son Pat Knight became the head coach of the team for several seasons until Billy Gillispie replaced him. In 2013, Tubby Smith replaced Gillispie. After Tubby Smith's departure in 2016, Chris Beard, an assistant under Bob Knight, came aboard. Beard quickly achieved national attention, leading the team to its first Elite Eight appearance in just his second season. He led the Red Raiders to the Final Four in his third year, losing in the National Championship game to Virginia. The Red Raiders current head coach is Mark Adams

Since 1999, Texas Tech has played home basketball games at United Spirit Arena, a 15,020-seat multipurpose facility which cost $ in  dollars to build. In addition to serving as home to the men's and women's basketball teams, the Red Raider volleyball team uses the arena. Texas Tech students broke the Big 12 Conference record for student attendance at the United Spirit Arena during a February 25, 2014 loss to Kansas State. The record of 6,086 students fell less than 2,000 short of the national record.

The Red Raiders football team, is a member of the NCAA Football Bowl Subdivision (formerly known as Division I-A) and is coached by Joey McGuire. Throughout the 2000s, then head coach Mike Leach lead the team to national prominence. In 14 of its last 15 seasons, the Red Raiders have finished with a winning record, the fourth-longest such streak in the nation at the time. The Red Raiders have made 36 bowl appearances, which is 17th most of any university. From 1932 to 1956, as members of the Border Intercollegiate Athletic Association, the Red Raiders won eight conference championships and one co-championship, the most held by a Border Conference member. After joining the Southwest Conference, the Red Raiders added conference co-championships in 1976 and 1994.

Jones AT&T Stadium is home to the Red Raiders football team. The stadium, named for Clifford B. and Audrey Jones, opened in 1947 and has a capacity of 60,454. In 2000, the stadium was renamed Jones SBC Stadium after SBC Communications made a $30 million contribution to the university. Following SBC Communications' acquisition of AT&T Corporation in 2006 and its subsequent adoption of the AT&T name, the stadium was renamed Jones AT&T Stadium. The stadium's original seating capacity was 27,000, but it was expanded in 1959, 1972, 2003, 2009, 2010, and 2013.

On August 7, 2008, the Board of Regents of the Texas Tech University System announced a $25 million expansion project. The expansion added a Spanish Renaissance-themed façade to the stadium's east side. In addition to the improvements to the facility's exterior, the expansion added 1,000 general-admission seats, 550 club seats, and 26 suites. Texas Tech allocated $19 million to the expansion and added another $6 million through fund-raising initiatives. On November 20, 2008, university officials announced the project's fundraising goal had been exceeded. The expansion' groundbreaking ceremonies took place on November 29, 2008, and construction was completed before the 2009 football season.

In January 2013, construction added another 368 seats in the north endzone and two observation decks. The $11 million project also includes a significantly upgraded jumbotron with a new sound system, a Spanish Renaissance-themed colonnade, and a north end zone concourse that connects the two stadium halves. Along with the other additions, 157 feet of ribbon board will be added on the north end zone, more than 160 linear feet in the northeast and northwest corners of the stadium, and 94 lineal feet in the south end zone over the athletic offices. The construction was completed during the 2013 season. The stadium's capacity is 60,862, making it the third-largest on-campus stadium in Texas.

The Red Raiders baseball team played its first game in 1925.  The team has two conference championships, two conference tournament championships, and has made nine NCAA Division I Baseball Championship tournament appearances.  Larry Hays coached the team from 1987 to 2008 and compiled a .639 winning percentage. Following Hays' retirement on June 2, 2008, Assistant Coach Dan Spencer was promoted to head coach. Dan Spencer was replaced by Tim Tadlock following the 2012 season and made its first appearance in the College World Series in 2013. At least 20 former Red Raiders baseball players have gone on to play in the Major Leagues.  The team plays its home games at Dan Law Field at Rip Griffin Park. The field, renovated in 2012 and on the main campus in Lubbock, has a seating capacity of 5,050.

Texas Tech's track and field teams have been led by head coach Wes Kittley since 2000. Under Kittley, the men's team won the NCAA Division I Outdoor Track and Field Championship in 2019, and has produced seven Olympic medalists, 16 national champions, over 200 All-Americans and 119 Big 12 Champions including Michael Mathieu, Sally Kipyego, Kennedy Kithuka, Shereefa Lloyd, Gil Roberts and others.

In addition to varsity sports, the university's Sport Clubs Federation offers 30 recreational and competitive sport clubs, including polo, rugby union, lacrosse, fencing, and soccer. In 2006, Texas Tech beat rival Texas A&M to win the United States Polo Association National Intercollegiate Championship.

Mascots 
The Masked Rider is Texas Tech University's oldest mascot. The tradition began in 1936, when "ghost riders" were dared to circle the field prior to home football games. The Masked Rider became an official mascot in 1954, when Joe Kirk Fulton led the team onto the field at the Gator Bowl. According to reports from those at the game, the crowd sat in stunned silence as they watched Fulton and his horse Blackie rush onto the football field, followed by the team. After a few moments, the silent crowd burst into cheers. Ed Danforth, a writer for the Atlanta Journal who witnessed the event, later wrote, "No team in any bowl game ever made a more sensational entrance." In 2000, The Masked Rider tradition was commemorated with the unveiling of a statue outside of the university's Frazier Alumni Pavilion. The sculpture, created by artist Grant Speed, is 25% larger than life.

Today, the Masked Rider, with guns up, leads the team onto the field for all home games. This mascot, adorned in a distinctive gaucho hat like those worn by members of the marching band, is one of the most visible figures at Texas Tech.

Texas Tech's other mascot, Raider Red, is a more recent creation. Beginning with the 1971 football season, the Southwest Conference forbade the inclusion of live animal mascots to away games unless the host school consented. For situations where the host school did not want to allow the Masked Rider's horse, an alternative mascot was needed. Jim Gaspard, a member of the Saddle Tramps student spirit organization, created the original design for the Raider Red costume, basing it on a character created by cartoonist Dirk West, a Texas Tech alumnus and former Lubbock mayor. Although the Masked Rider's identity is public knowledge, it has always been tradition that Raider Red's student alter ego is kept secret until the end of his or her tenure. The student serving as Raider Red is a member of the Saddle Tramps or High Riders.

Traditions

Carol of Lights 

The Carol of Lights is an annual event, sponsored by the Residence Halls Association, traditionally held the first Friday in December, to celebrate the holiday season. The event begins with a carillon concert, from the 43 bells in the west tower of the Administration Building followed a torch-light processional by the Saddle Tramps and High Riders spirit organizations. The Texas Tech Trombone Choir and combined choirs lead the crowd in singing carols and the illumination ceremony culminates with a soloist performance of "O Holy Night" in the Science Quadrangle. This is followed by the lighting ceremony, where 13 buildings within the Texas Technological College Historic District are illuminated with the over 25,000 red, white, and orange lights. The lights remain on the campus buildings until the first week when students come back from the holiday break.

In 1959, Texas Tech University Board of Directors member Harold Hinn planned and provided the funding to cover the Science Quadrangle and Administration Building with 5,000 lights. However, students were away on Christmas break and did not see the display. The following year, the Residence Hall Association sponsored the event under the name "Christmas Sing". In 1961, the event was renamed Carol of Lights and the display increased to 16,000 lights. The tradition has since grown to include decorations like the 38-foot lighted Christmas tree, 3,000 luminaries lining the sidewalks of Memorial Circle, and a 21-foot fresh pine wreath hung on the Physics/Geosciences building built by Women's Service Organization.

Double T 

The most readily identified symbol of Texas Tech is the Double T. The logo, generally attributed to Texas Tech's first football coach, E. Y. Freeland, was first used as decoration on the sweaters for the football players. The Double T existed in its original form as an official logo from 1963 to 1999 and was updated in 2000. The new logo maintains the original premise, but incorporates three-dimensional beveling effects coupled with white trim.

To recognize the importance of the Double T to Texas Tech, the class of 1931 donated the Double T bench. By tradition, freshmen are not allowed to sit on the bench, which is in the courtyard of the Administration Building. The logo is further embodied in the Double T neon sign, donated by the class of 1938 and affixed to the east side of Jones AT&T Stadium. At the time of its purchase, this was reputedly the largest neon sign in existence.

Will Rogers and Soapsuds 

One of the most well-known landmarks on campus is the statue of Will Rogers on his horse Soapsuds. The statue, entitled "Riding Into the Sunset", has resided at the center of the campus since it was dedicated on February 16, 1950, by Rogers' longtime friend Amon G. Carter. Carter claimed that Texas Tech was the ideal setting for the statue, and that it would be an appropriate addition to the traditions and scenery of West Texas.  The statue, estimated to cost $25,000 ($239,000 in 2013 dollars) when it was dedicated, stands  and weighs . The inscription on the plaque at the base of the statue reads: "Lovable Old Will Rogers on his favorite horse, 'Soapsuds', riding into the Western sunset."

The statue continues to be a part of school tradition. Before every home football game, the Saddle Tramps wrap it with red crêpe paper, a tradition dating back to 1969 and a loss to Texas A&M after which the statue was found covered in maroon paint in an apparent prank. In times of national tragedies, the statue has also been wrapped in black crêpe paper.

According to one campus legend taught to students during freshman orientation, the statue was originally to be positioned with Will Rogers facing due west, so it would appear he was riding into the sunset. However, that position would cause Soapsuds' posterior end to face due east, a dubious greeting to visitors entering by the main eastern campus entrance where the statue is placed. The horse's rear would also be facing downtown Lubbock, potentially insulting the Lubbock business community. The legend holds that this problem was solved by Tech's Civil Engineering department, who calculated that a 23° turn of Soapsuds' head to the north would line up Soapsuds' rear end directly toward College Station, Texas, home of the rival Texas A&M Aggies. Modern surveys and satellite imagery have determined the statue's posterior end actually points roughly equidistantly between College Station and Austin, home of another rival team, the Texas Longhorns.

Texas Tech ring 
While the class ring had occasionally used a universal design, by the late 20th century, various styles were available. In 1999, the university reverted to a single ring design for the university's graduates. The new Official Texas Tech Alumni Association Class Ring symbolically captures the essence of Texas Tech with the prominent Double T logo surrounded by the school's full name and date of foundation. By tradition, undergraduates wear the ring with the Double T logo facing themselves. Upon graduation, the ring is turned so the logo faces outward.

One shoulder of the ring displays an image of the Administration Building, with the bells which represent victory. The other shoulder contains the university seal: an American eagle perched above a book, representing the church; a star, representing the State of Texas; a key, representing home; and, a lamp, representing knowledge. These elements are separated by a cross featuring ten cotton bolls, one each for Lubbock and its nine surrounding cotton-producing counties.

Notable alumni 

The Texas Tech Alumni Association, with over 27,000 members, operates more than 120 chapters in cities throughout the United States and the world. Throughout Texas Tech's history, faculty, alumni, and former students have played prominent roles in many different fields. Among its Distinguished Alumni is Demetrio B. Lakas, President of the Republic of Panama from 1969 to 1978. Three United States Governors, Daniel I. J. Thornton, Governor of Colorado from 1951 to 1955, John Burroughs, Governor of New Mexico from 1959 to 1961, and Preston Smith, Governor of Texas from 1968 to 1972, are graduates of the university. Texas Tech alumni have also served in the Texas Legislature, including State Representative Justin Holland from 2017 to present.

Five astronauts, including Rick Husband, the final commander of Space Shuttle Columbia and recipient of the Congressional Space Medal of Honor, graduated from the university. U.S. Marine Corps Major and Medal of Honor recipient George H. O'Brien Jr. is a distinguished alumnus. Richard E. Cavazos is a two-time Distinguished Service Cross recipient and the first Hispanic and Mexican American to advance to the rank of four-star general in the U.S. Army. United States Air Force Major General Wendy Motlong Masiello, one of the highest-ranking women in the United States Department of Defense, is a 1980 graduate of Texas Tech's Rawls College of Business Administration. Alumna Arati Prabhakar, the former head of DARPA, was the first woman to head the National Institute of Standards and Technology. Ginger Kerrick, American physicist, was the first Hispanic female NASA Flight Director. Charles Q. Brown Jr. is the first African-American to be appointed as chief of staff of the United States Air Force and the first African-American to lead any branch of the United States Armed Forces. Texas Tech's influence on the business world is seen in such people as General Motors Chairman and CEO Edward Whitacre Jr., Finisar CEO Jerry S. Rawls, Belo Corporation CEO Dunia A. Shive, and ExxonMobil board member Angela Braly, ranked by Fortune magazine as the most powerful woman in business. Scott Pelley, anchor and managing editor for CBS Evening News and correspondent for 60 Minutes, is a graduate of the College of Media & Communication.

Texas Tech alumni have also made contributions to sports, music, and acting. Texas Tech Red Raiders have gone on to play in the NFL, NBA, WNBA, and MLB. Two of the most notable football players are Donny Anderson who as a member of the Green Bay Packers when they won Super Bowl I & Super Bowl II, and longtime Miami Dolphins All-Pro linebacker Zach Thomas. Alumni standouts include 2018 NFL MVP and All-Pro quarterback Patrick Mahomes, two-time Bilentenkoff Award-winning wide receiver Michael Crabtree, Danny Amendola, and Wes Welker. Others among the university's alumni are folk rocker John Denver, country singer Pat Green, mezzo-soprano Susan Graham, actor Barry Corbin, Friday Night Lights actor Brad Leland, and actor George Eads. John Hinckley Jr., who attempted to assassinate U.S. President Ronald Reagan in 1981, attended the university sporadically from 1973 to 1980.

See also
 List of colleges and universities in Texas

Notes

References

Further reading
 Ruth Horn Andrews, The First Thirty Years: A History Of Texas Technological College, 1925–1955. Lubbock, TX: Texas Tech Press, 1956.

External links 

 
 
 
 
 

 
Public universities and colleges in Texas
Educational institutions established in 1923
Renaissance Revival architecture in Texas
Universities and colleges accredited by the Southern Association of Colleges and Schools
Technological universities in the United States
Texas Tech